The Office for War Veterans and Victims of Oppression in the main institution in the Government of Poland to deal with the issues of Polish veterans of struggles for independence and victims of oppression. In 1991 a special status was set up for people of these categories, and the main tasks of the Office include awarding this status, providing care for people  with this status, and disseminating the information about their life and struggle.

See also
Siberian Exiles Cross
Badge of honor An activist of the anti-communist opposition or a person repressed for political reasons
Council for the Protection of Struggle and Martyrdom Sites
Institute of National Remembrance

References

Government agencies of Poland
1991 establishments in Poland